The Minor Arcana, sometimes Lesser Arcana, are the suit cards in a cartomantic tarot deck.

Ordinary tarot cards first appeared in northern Italy in the 1440s and were designed for tarot card games. They typically have four suits each of 10 unillustrated pip cards numbered one (ace) to ten, along with 4 court cards (face cards). Tarot games are still widely played in central and southern Europe and French Tarot is the second most popular card game in France after Belote.

By contrast, cartomantic tarot cards emerged in France in the late 18th century popularised by occultists such as Etteilla. The terms "Major" and "Minor Arcana" originate with Jean-Baptiste Pitois (1811–1877), writing under the name Paul Christian.

In their contemporary versions, the Minor Arcana are often illustrated—a convention popularized by the Rider-Waite Tarot in 1910.  Used in a tarot card reading in conjunction with the Major Arcana, the cards of the Minor Arcana suggest subtleties and details and signify day-to-day insights.

Tarot variations derived from Latin-suited packs typically have a Minor Arcana of 56 cards, with 14 cards in each suit: Wands (alternately batons, clubs, staffs, or staves), Cups (chalices, goblets, or vessels), Swords (or blades), and Pentacles (coins, disks, or rings).  The four court cards are commonly page, knight, queen, and king. Some variations have princess and prince cards replacing the page and knight cards; the historic Visconti-Sforza Tarot expands the court with two additional cards: the damsel and the mounted lady. While the historical Tarot of Marseilles contains 56 cards, later decks based on the French suits of clubs (♣), hearts, spades (♠), and diamonds have only three face cards per suit, with a jack (or knave) in addition to the queen and king.

Symbolism
In divinatory, esoteric and occult tarot, the Minor Arcana are believed to represent relatively mundane features of life. The court cards represent the people whom one meets.

Each suit also has distinctive characteristics and connotations commonly held to be as follows:

Gallery of card suits
Illustrations from the Rider–Waite Tarot, the most popular amongst English speakers, divided by suit and arranged in ascending order of face value.

Wands

Cups

Swords

Pentacles

Planetary associations
In the Order of the Golden Dawn, number cards are associated with planets, corresponding to their placement in Kabbalah.

Threes - Saturn
Fours - Jupiter
Fives - Mars
Sixes - Sun
Sevens - Venus
Eights - Mercury
Nines - Moon
Tens - Earth

References

External links

 
Cartomancy

de:Tarot#Die kleinen Arkana